Louis W. Tompros is an American lawyer and academic. He is currently a faculty member of the Harvard Law School.

Early life and education
Tompros attended Yale University where he received a BA degree in English in 2000. Later, he was admitted to Harvard Law School where he completed J.D. in 2003. During his time at Harvard, he was a research assistant to Alan Dershowitz and Charles Nesson and won Ames Moot Court Competition.

Career
After his graduation from law school, Tompros clerked for Robert J. Cordy and later, for Richard Linn. He was admitted to the bar in 2003. The following year, he became an associate at WilmerHale. Tompros became a partner at WilmerHale in 2012.

In 2004, in a law suit, he represented LGBT service members challenging the military Don't Ask, Don't Tell policy alongside Servicemembers Legal Defense Network.  Later, in connection with the Volunteer Lawyers for the Arts, he represented the artist Winsom after her artwork was damaged by a museum.

In 2014, Tompros respresented Intel and Broadcom in winning patent cases. In 2019, he defended Bombardier Recreational Products in a $130 million trademark case brought by Jaguar Land Rover.

In June 2019, Tompros helped Matt Furie win his copyright lawsuit against Alex Jones website, InfoWars, who were using his creation, Pepe the Frog.

In August 2022, Tompros represented artist Ryder Ripps in a trademark lawsuit filed against him by Yuga Labs, the parent company of the Bored Ape Yacht Club NFT.

In November 2022, Tompros won a trademark case against singer Mariah Carey, in which the U.S. Patent and Trademark Office denied Carey applications to trademark "Queen of Christmas" and "Princess Christmas".

Tompros currently teaches at Harvard Law School. He also serves as Chair of the Massachusetts Equal Justice Coalition.

Works
 The Rise of Counter-Disinformation Litigation and What It Means for Business (2022)
 The Constitutionality of Criminalizing False Speech Made on Social Networking Sites in a Post-Alvarez, Social Media-Obsessed World, 31 Harv. J.L. & Tech. 66 (2017)

Awards and recognition
 Best Lawyers in America
 Boston Magazine's Lawyer List (2021)

References

Yale College alumni
Harvard Law School faculty
American lawyers
Harvard Law School alumni
Year of birth missing (living people)
Living people